State Route 126 (SR 126) is a  state highway that runs northwest-to-southeast through portions of Bleckley, Dodge, Laurens, and Wheeler counties in the central part of the U.S. state of Georgia.

Route description
SR 126 begins at an intersection with SR 26 (East Dykes Street) in Cochran, in Bleckley County. It heads east to an intersection with U.S. Route 23 (US 23) and SR 87 on the eastern edge of the city. The highway passes through rural areas of the county, passing Cochran Airport, and enters Dodge County. In the county, the road has a brief concurrency with SR 257 in Chester. In Laurens County, it meets SR 117 (Main Street) in Cadwell. To the southwest, it begins a concurrency with SR 46 to the east. The two highways head northeast to an intersection with US 319/US 441/SR 31. The two then begin a curve to the southeast. Just over  later, they split, with SR 46 heading east-northeast and SR 126 heading southeast. It enters Wheeler County, and has an intersection with US 280/SR 30. The road continues to the southeast, until it meets its southeastern terminus, an intersection with SR 19 north of Lumber City.

SR 126 is not part of the National Highway System.

Major intersections

See also

References

External links

 Georgia Roads (Routes 121 - 140)

126
Transportation in Bleckley County, Georgia
Transportation in Dodge County, Georgia
Transportation in Laurens County, Georgia
Transportation in Wheeler County, Georgia